Kara Dag or Qara Dag (Dag/Dağ/Dagh, occasionally Daq or Tagh) is Turkic for "Black Mountain". It may be written as one word (Karadag), a hyphenated word (Kara-dag), or as two words (Kara Dag).  Any of these spellings may refer to:

People
Fikri Karadağ (born 1953), Turkish army colonel indicted for treason

Places

Azerbaijan
Karadagly, Agdam or Karadağ, Azerbaijan
Qaradağ, Agsu, a village and municipality in the Agsu Rayon, Azerbaijan
Qaradağ raion, a village and rayon near Baku, Azerbaijan
Qaradağ, Gadabay, a village and municipality in the Gadabay Rayon, Azerbaijan
Qaradaş or Qaradağ, a village and municipality in the Tovuz Rayon, Azerbaijan

Iran
Qara Daq, East Azarbaijan or Arasbaran, a mountain range in Iran
Qarrah Dagh, Zanjan, a village in Golabar, Ijrud County, Iran

Elsewhere
Kara Dag Mountain, an extinct volcano in Crimea
Montenegro, the state or province, known as Karadağ under the Ottoman Empire
Skopska Crna Gora, formerly known as Kara-dagh or Karadag, a mountain range north of Skopje, Macedonia, Kosovo and Serbia
Mount Karadağ, an extinct volcano in Turkey
Karadağ, Kaş, a village in Antalya Province, Turkey
Karadağ, Çan
Karadağ, Ezine
Karadağ, Kemah
Karadağ, Narman

Other uses
Karadag Khanate (1747–1808), a khanate around Ahar, Iran
Karadagh rug, a style of carpet from the Karadagh area of Iran

See also
Qaradağlı (disambiguation)
Black Mountain (disambiguation)
Tribes of Karadagh, the Turkic peoples of Arasbaran